Karl Augustus Menninger (July 22, 1893 – July 18, 1990) was an American psychiatrist and a member of the Menninger family of psychiatrists who founded the Menninger Foundation and the Menninger Clinic in Topeka, Kansas.

Biography 
Menninger was born on July 22, 1893 in Topeka, Kansas, the son of Florence Vesta (Kinsley) and Charles Frederick Menninger. In addition to studying at Washburn University, Indiana University and the University of Wisconsin–Madison, he also studied medicine at Harvard Medical School. He graduated from the school cum laude in 1917. While at Washburn, he was a member of the Alpha Delta Fraternity, a local group. In 1960 he was inducted into the school's Sagamore Honor Society.

Beginning with an internship in Kansas City, Menninger worked at the Boston Psychopathic Hospital and taught at Harvard Medical School. In 1919, he returned to Topeka where, together with his father, he founded the Menninger Clinic. By 1925, they had attracted enough investors, including brother William C. Menninger, to build the Menninger Sanitarium. His book, The Human Mind, which explained the science of psychiatry, was published in 1930.

The Menninger Foundation was established in 1941. After World War II, Karl Menninger was instrumental in founding the Winter Veterans Administration Hospital, in Topeka. It became the largest psychiatric training center in the world. He was among the first members of the Society for General Systems Research.

In 1946 he founded the Menninger School of Psychiatry. It was renamed in his honor in 1985 as the Karl Menninger School of Psychiatry and Mental Health Science. In 1952, Karl Targownik, who would become one of his closest friends, joined the Clinic.

Personal life

Menninger married Grace Gaines in 1916, with whom he had three children: Martha, Julia and Robert. The couple divorced in February 1941. Menninger remarried on September 9, 1941, taking Jeanette Lyle as his wife. Together they adopted a daughter named Rosemary in 1948. He died of abdominal cancer July 18, 1990, four days before his 97th birthday.

In popular culture

Author Chaim Potok quoted Menninger on the dedication page of his novel, The Chosen (1967). 
Renee Richards quoted Menninger on the dedication page of her memoir, Second Serve (1983).
In the 1995 biographical film Killer: A Journal Of Murder, Menninger is portrayed by John Bedford Lloyd, as the psychiatrist in charge of testing the sanity of serial killer Carl Panzram.
Karl Menninger figures in the French film (in the English language) Jimmy P: Psychotherapy of a Plains Indian (2013), portrayed by Larry Pine.

Work 
During his career, Menninger wrote a number of influential books. In his first book, The Human Mind, Menninger argued that psychiatry was a science and that the mentally ill were only slightly different from healthy individuals. In The Crime of Punishment, Menninger argued that crime was preventable through psychiatric treatment; punishment was a brutal and inefficient relic of the past. He advocated treating offenders like the mentally ill.

His subsequent books include The Vital Balance, Man Against Himself and Love Against Hate.

Honors
In 1981, Menninger was awarded the Presidential Medal of Freedom by Jimmy Carter.
In 1985, the Menninger School of Psychiatry was named for him.

Letter to Thomas Szasz
On October 6, 1988, less than two years before his death, Karl Menninger wrote a letter to Thomas Szasz, author of The Myth of Mental Illness.

In the letter, Menninger said that he has just read Szasz's book Insanity: The Idea and Its Consequences. Menninger wrote that neither of them liked the situation in which insanity separates men from men and free will is forgotten. After recounting the lack of scientific method in psychology over the years, Menninger expressed his regret that he did not come over to a dialogue with Szasz.

See also
 Malan triangles
 Menninger Foundation
 Reinisch Rose Garden and Doran Rock Garden

Publications 
Menninger wrote several books and articles. A selection:
 1930. The Human Mind. Garden City, NY: Garden City Pub. Co.
 1931. From Sin to Psychiatry, an Interview on the Way to Mental Health with Dr. Karl A. Menninger [by] L. M. Birkhead. Little Blue Books Series #1585. Girard, Kansas: Haldeman-Julius Press.
 1938. Man Against Himself. New York: Harcourt, Brace.
 1942. Love Against Hate
 1950. Guide to Psychiatric Books; with a Suggested Basic Reading List. New York: Grune & Stratton.
 1952. Manual for Psychiatric Case Study. New York: Grune & Stratton.
 1958. Theory of Psychoanalytic Technique. New York: Basic Books.
 1959. A Psychiatrist’s World: Selected Papers. New York: Viking Press.
 1963. The Vital Balance: The Life Process in Mental Health and Illness. New York: Viking Penguin.
 1968. Das Leben als Balance; seelische Gesundheit und Krankheit im Lebensprozess. München: R. Piper.
 1968. The Crime of Punishment. New York: Penguin Books.
 1972. A Guide to Psychiatric Books in English [by] Karl Menninger. New York: Grune & Stratton.
 1973. Whatever Became of Sin?. New York: Hawthorn Books.
 1978. The Human Mind Revisited: Essays in Honor of Karl A. Menninger. Edited by Sydney Smith. New York: International Universities Press.
 1985. Conversations with Dr. Karl Menninger (sound recording)

References

External links

 
Bartleby article on Karl Menninger
Scottish Rite Journal Obituary
Search on Karl Menninger in Menninger Foundation Archives Database from Kansas State Historical Society
 Access Karl Menninger photographs and documents on Kansas Memory, the Kansas State Historical Society's digital portal
Correspondence with Thomas Szasz

1893 births
1990 deaths
American psychiatrists
Analysands of Franz Alexander
Analysands of Ruth Mack Brunswick
Harvard Medical School alumni
History of psychiatry
Physicians from Kansas
Presidential Medal of Freedom recipients
Scientists from Kansas
Washburn University alumni
Writers from Topeka, Kansas
University of Wisconsin–Madison alumni
Deaths from cancer in Kansas
Deaths from stomach cancer